The 1913 New Zealand tour rugby of North America was the second tour by the New Zealand national rugby union outside Australasia. Sixteen matches were played (all won) along with a Test match against United States sides.

The tour had a relevance for American rugby because it came at a time when the local code, American football, was  widely criticized prompted by worries over violent play, serious injuries and evidence of sharp practice by college coaches. That dispute, originated in 1906, had led some colleges (such as Stanford and California, Berkeley Universities) to switch from football to rugby. The All Blacks (which had toured in North America for the first time in 1905) had already made their contribution to the spread of the sport in the west coast.

New Zealand took the tour seriously, with a squad led by veteran player Alex McDonald that won all their matches in North America with large victories, conceding only 6 points in 16 games. The only test was played against the United States, which included players from Stanford and Berkeley.

The impact of such hard defeats induced a depression by the result, widely covered by the media which emphasized the big difference because Californian players and the New Zealand side.

As a result, the University of California returned to football in 1915, although Stanford would remain in rugby, generating an extraordinary performance of the national team in the 1920 and 1924 Olympic Games, winning the gold medal in both occasions.

Squad

Match summary 
Complete list of matches played by the All Blacks in North America:

 Test matches

Match details

See also 
 List of All Blacks tours and series
 History of rugby union in the United States

References 

New Zealand
New Zealand tour
tour
Rugby union tours of the United States
Rugby union tours of Canada
New Zealand national rugby union team tours of North America
1913 in North American sport
1913 in American sports